Georg Eduard Hallberger, after 1869: von Hallberger (29 March 1822, Stuttgart - 29 August 1880, Tutzing) was a German publisher and businessman.

Biography 
After serving an apprenticeship in his father's company, he spent his journeyman years at publishers in Potsdam and Berlin. Upon returning to Stuttgart, during the Revolutions, he started his own publishing firm, with an emphasis on youth and folk literature. In 1850, he began issuing a monthly magazine for young people, which was published until 1889.

In 1853, he created the family magazine, which was very successful and eventually had a circulation of 150,000 copies. Encouraged by this, he joined with the writers, Friedrich Wilhelm Hackländer and Edmund Zoller (1822-1902), to create the illustrated news magazine Über Land und Meer. This was equally successful and was published until 1923. Later magazines failed to match the popularity of these first two. 

To produce his illustrations, he created "E. Hallberger X. A."; among the largest xylographic companies in Germany. One of his most popular works, Aegypten in Bild und Wort (Egypt in Image and Word), with commentary by the Egyptologist, Georg Ebers, was issued in 1879 and translated into several languages, including English, French and Czech.

After the Franco-Prussian War, he founded a major subsidiary in Leipzig. Over the years, he expanded his business interests to include coal companies, bricklayers, quarries, cement and paper mills. In Switzerland, he owned a creamery. He also became a major property owner, with buildings throughout Stuttgart and a "castle" in Tutzing, on the Starnberger See.

In 1869, he was named a "" and elevated to the nobility in Württemberg. He died at his castle in 1880. A "Temple of Honor", erected at Ilkahöhe by his daughter, Gabriele, was demolished in the 1970s

Sources

Further reading 
 Felix Berner: "Die Verlegerfamilie Hallberger. Gründer der Deutschen Verlags-Anstalt." In: Lebensbilder aus Schwaben und Franken, Vol.15. Stuttgart, Kohlhammer, 1983, pgs.280–315.  
 Felix Berner: Louis und Eduard Hallberger : die Gründer der Deutschen Verlags-Anstalt. Stuttgart : Deutsche Verlags-Anstalt. 1985  
 "Hallberger, Eduard von." In: Rudolf Schmidt: Deutsche Buchhändler. Deutsche Buchdrucker. Beiträge zu einer Firmengeschichte des deutschen Buchgewerbes. Vol. 2. Berlin: Franz Weber, 1903, pgs.363–369, Online.
 Gustav Wais: "Gründung und Aufbau der Deutschen Verlags-Anstalt. Das große Werk Eduard Hallbergers und seiner Nachfolger. Aus der Geschichte Stuttgarts, als Stadt der Verlage, nicht wegzudenken". In: Stuttgarter Zeitung, #217, 20. September 1958, pg.35.

External links 

1822 births
1880 deaths
German publishers (people)
Businesspeople from Stuttgart
German magazine publishers (people)
German magazine founders